Jeevnane Natka Samy is a 2021 Indian Kannada-language drama film. It is directed by Raju Bhandari Rajavartha. Lalitha Rajashekhar Shrihatti is the producer of the film. Kiran Raj, Anika Ramya, Shree Harsha and Pavitra Kotian are in the prominent roles. With the run of around 126 minutes, Athishay Jain has composed the music of the film.

Cast 
 Kiran Raj as Akash
 Shree Harsha as Santhosh
 Anika Ramya as Sneha
 Pavitra Kotian as Suchitra
 Joker Hanumanthu as Umapati
 Rudrayai Sahukar

Reception 
The film received middling reviews.

References

External links 
 

2021 films
2020s Kannada-language films
Indian drama films
2021 drama films